Selau/Suir Rural LLG is a local-level government (LLG) of the Autonomous Region of Bougainville, Papua New Guinea.

Wards
01. Sorom
02. Hantoa
03. Siara
04. Rapoma
05. Suir Coastal
06. Suir Inland

References

Local-level governments of the Autonomous Region of Bougainville